A toolbox is a container used to organize, carry, and protect the owner's tools.

Toolbox may also refer to:

 Macintosh Toolbox, a set of application programming interfaces
 Toolbox (album), a 1991 album by Ian Gillan
 Jetbrains Toolbox, A JetBrains application
 Toolbox (software), an integrated development environment designed to introduce computer programming in academic subjects

See also

 Tool Box, an album by Aaron Tippin
 Tool Box (Calexico album), 2007
 NIH Toolbox